The Liberty Schoolhouse, also known as the Mt. Grove School, is a historic schoolhouse in a remote part of Ozark-St. Francis National Forest in Logan County, Arkansas.  It is east of Corley, Arkansas, near the junction of Valentine Spring and Copper Spring Roads.  It is a single-story vernacular wood-frame structure, with a gabled roof, weatherboard siding, and a foundation of concrete block piers.  It was built in 1897, and was used by the community as both a school and church.  It served as a school until 1944, and also hosted civic meetings and social events.

The building was listed on the National Register of Historic Places in 2010.

It is a one-room schoolhouse.

See also
National Register of Historic Places listings in Logan County, Arkansas

References

School buildings on the National Register of Historic Places in Arkansas
One-room schoolhouses in Arkansas
Churches on the National Register of Historic Places in Arkansas
National Register of Historic Places in Logan County, Arkansas
School buildings completed in 1897
Buildings and structures in Logan County, Arkansas
Ozark–St. Francis National Forest